John Matthias may refer to:
 John Matthias (poet), American poet
 John Matthias (footballer) (1878–?), Welsh international footballer.
 John M. Matthias, politician in the Ohio House of Representatives
 John B. Matthias (1767–1848), writer of the words and music for the gospel song "Palms of Victory"

See also
John Mathias (born 1949), American sailor